This is a list of listed buildings in Sorø Municipality, Denmark.

List

4173 Fjenneslev

4180 Sorø

4291 Ruds Vedby

4293 Dianalund

References

External links

 Danish Agency of Culture

 
Sorø